The Parliament of New South Wales is a bicameral legislature in the Australian state of New South Wales (NSW), consisting of the New South Wales Legislative Assembly (lower house) and the New South Wales Legislative Council (upper house). Each house is directly elected by the people of New South Wales at elections held approximately every four years. The Parliament derives its authority from the King of Australia, King Charles III, represented by the Governor of New South Wales, who chairs the Executive Council. The parliament shares law making powers with the Australian Federal (or Commonwealth) Parliament. The New South Wales Parliament follows Westminster parliamentary traditions of dress, Green–Red chamber colours and protocols.

It is located in Parliament House on Macquarie Street, Sydney.

History
The Parliament of New South Wales was the first of the Australian colonial legislatures, with its formation in the 1850s. At the time, New South Wales was a British colony under the control of the Governor. A small, appointed Legislative Council began meeting in 1824 to advise the Governor on legislative matters. By 1843, this had been enlarged, with two-thirds of its members elected by adult males who met certain property requirements.

In 1850, the Australian Colonies Government Act was passed by the Imperial Parliament, which expanded the New South Wales Legislative Council so that by 1851 there were 54 members – again, with two-thirds elected. In 1853, a select committee chaired by William Wentworth began drawing up a constitution for responsible self-government in the colony.  While many of the provisions in the committee's proposed constitution were accepted when placed before the Legislative Council in August that year, a proposal to create a colonial nobility was subject to heavy criticism and later withdrawn.  

The approved bicameral structure included a fully elected Legislative Assembly, as well as a Legislative Council whose members were appointed for life. A government assumed most of the Governor's legislative powers. The new constitution was sent to the Imperial Parliament and passed into law on 16 July 1855. On 22 May 1856, the newly constituted New South Wales Parliament opened and sat for the first time. With the new 54-member Legislative Assembly taking over the council chamber, a second meeting chamber for the 21 member upper house had to be added to the Parliament building on Macquarie Street.

The Electoral Act of 1858 made additional changes. The right to vote was extended to most males over 21 years of age. However, men "in the receipt of aid from any charitable institution" were ineligible. This was deemed to include all people living on Aboriginal stations and reserves. Other men not able to vote included those "of unsound mind", incarcerated individuals, and members of the military or the police.

In 1859 Queensland was made a colony separate from New South Wales. The Legislative Assembly was reduced from 80 to 72 members by the loss of the Queensland seats. In 1901, New South Wales became a state of the Commonwealth of Australia, and many government functions were transferred to the new Commonwealth government.  In 1902, the current constitution of New South Wales was adopted.

Women gained the right to vote in Commonwealth elections in April 1902, and in New South Wales state elections in August 1902. In 1918, reforms permitted women to be members of Parliament, although no woman was elected until 1925 when Millicent Preston-Stanley was elected to represent the Eastern Suburbs. That same year, a proportional representation system was introduced for the Legislative Assembly with multiple representatives from each electorate; this system lasted until it was abolished in 1926. Women were not able to be appointed to the Legislative Council until 1926; Premier John Storey attempted to appoint Kate Dwyer to the Legislative Council in 1921, but the appointment was ruled out of order. The first two women appointed to the Legislative Council were both Australian Labor Party members proposed on 23 November 1931: Catherine Green, who took her seat the following day, and Ellen Webster, who joined her two days later.

In 1925, 1926 and 1929, Premier Jack Lang made unsuccessful attempts to abolish the Legislative Council, following the example of the Queensland Legislative Council in 1922.  These attempts led to further reform, and in 1933 the law was changed so that a quarter of the Legislative Council would be elected every three years by members of the Legislative Assembly and the Legislative Council, rather than being appointed by the Governor.

From 1926, people receiving aid could again be on the electoral roll. Compulsory voting was introduced in 1928.

In 1978, the Council became a directly elected body in a program of electoral reform introduced by the Wran Labor government. The number of members was reduced to 45, although transitional arrangements meant that there were 43 members from 1978 to 1981, and 44 from 1981 to 1984. Further reform in 1991 by the Greiner Liberal-National government saw the size of the Legislative Council cut to 42 members, with half being elected every 4 years. In 1991, the Legislative Assembly was reduced from 109 to 99 Members and then to 93 members in 1999.

Parliament House

The Parliament building was originally built on the orders of Governor Lachlan Macquarie, to be Sydney's second major hospital. In 1810, he awarded the contract to Garnham Blaxcell, Alexander Riley and Dr. D'Arcy Wentworth. The contract gave the builders the right to import 45,000 gallons of rum, for which they paid a duty of 3 shillings a gallon. They were able to sell it for a huge profit and in turn the government refunded them the duty as a payment for their work, thereby gaining for their construction the title of the 'Rum Hospital'. Originally consisting of three buildings, the central main building was demolished in 1879 to make way for the new Sydney Hospital, which was completed in 1885. The first building, now known as the Sydney Mint, was given to the Royal Mint in 1851 to become the Australian branch of its operations; it remained a mint until 1927.

The second building, originally built as the Chief Surgeon's quarters, was given to the government in 1829 for the purposes of a Parliament chamber. This chamber was added to following the growth of the legislature in 1843, and again in 1856. The last major renovation to the building was undertaken between 1974 and 1985, which saw a jumble of buildings that had become the parliamentary chambers demolished and replaced by a 12-story block linked by a fountain court to the original Parliament House.  The building was also restored to its 1908 appearance.

Composition and powers

The legislative authority, the Crown-in-Parliament, has three separate elements: the monarch, represented by the governor; the Legislative Assembly; and the Legislative Council. No individual may simultaneously be a member of both Houses.

All 93 members of the Legislative Assembly are elected at each general election from single-member districts using optional preferential voting to terms of up to four years. The 42 Legislative Council members are elected for two terms (a maximum of eight years), with half elected at each general election. Elections for the Legislative Council are conducted on a statewide, at-large basis (meaning all members represent the entire state) using the single transferable vote system similar to that used for elections to the federal Senate.

In the running of Parliament, the two presiding officers have a role that is similar to Ministers and their departments. The Speaker of the Legislative Assembly and the President of the Legislative Council are responsible for the employing of staff. In consultation with the parliamentary clerks, the presiding officers determine policy for the operation of their respective chambers and jointly for the Parliament.

Royal assent of the monarch is required for all bills to become law. The Crown also has executive powers which do not depend on Parliament, through prerogative powers, which include among others the ability to dissolve Parliament, make treaties, award honours, appoint officers and civil servants, and appoint and dismiss the premier. In practice these are always exercised by the governor on the advice of the premier of New South Wales and the other ministers of HM Government. The premier and government are directly accountable to Parliament through its control of public finances and the need for its confidence, and to the public through members of Parliament.

The governor chooses the premier, usually depending on the results of the general election, who then forms a government from members of the houses of Parliament. This must be someone who can command the confidence of a majority in the Legislative Assembly. This is usually a straightforward decision, though occasionally the governor has to make a judgment, as in August 1939 when the governor, Lord Wakehurst, handled a major political crisis brought about when the former deputy leader of the governing United Australia Party, Eric Spooner, brought down Premier Bertram Stevens in a motion of no confidence. Wakehurst asked the treasurer, Alexander Mair, to form a government.

The current premier of New South Wales is Dominic Perrottet of the Liberal Party. 

Government ministers (including the premier) must regularly answer questions in the chambers and there are a number of select committees that scrutinise particular issues and the workings of the government. There are also mechanisms that allow members of Parliament to bring to the attention of the government particular issues affecting their constituents.

For a bill to become law, it must be passed by both the Legislative Council and the Legislative Assembly and be assented to by the governor. Under Section 5A of the New South Wales Constitution Act (1902), a bill appropriating revenue for the ordinary annual services of the government can be presented to the governor for assent even if the upper house has not agreed to it.

State Opening and traditions

The State Opening of Parliament is an annual event that marks the commencement of a session of the Parliament of New South Wales. It is held in the Legislative Council Chamber, usually in November or December, or in a general election year, when the new Parliament first assembles. It is an occasion for much pomp and ceremony, usually with a guard of honour and with dignitaries of the state attending. The New South Wales Parliament maintains many of the traditions of the original Parliament of the United Kingdom, from which the New South Wales Parliament was founded.

The governor, or occasionally the monarch, reads a prepared speech, known as the Speech from the Throne, outlining the government's agenda for the coming year. The speech is not written by the governor, but rather by the Cabinet, and reflects the legislative agenda for which they seek the agreement of both houses of Parliament.

Queen Elizabeth II has opened the New South Wales Parliament on two occasions, on 4 February 1954, as part of her first visit to Australia, which was also the first occasion in which a monarch of Australia had opened a session of any Australian parliament. The other occasion was on 20 February 1992, during her visit to Sydney to celebrate the sesquicentenary of the incorporation of the City of Sydney, on which occasion she stated:

Emblem
The official emblem of the New South Wales Parliament is a crowned circlet featuring the coat of arms of New South Wales taking the form of a Scottish crest badge. Crest badges, much like clan tartans, do not have a long history, and owe much to Victorian era romanticism, having only been worn on the bonnet since the mid-19th century when the buckled strap device commonly used by the Order of the Garter was adopted as a popular design to encircle monogram escutcheons and heraldic crests.

The crest badge came to be accepted in the mid-20th century as the emblem of both houses of Parliament. The emblem appears on official stationery, publications and papers, and is stamped on various items in use in the Parliament, such as cutlery, silverware and china.

See also

 List of New South Wales state elections
 Parliaments of the Australian states and territories
 Official Openings by the Monarch in Australia

Notes

References

External links

 Official Parliament of New South Wales sites
 
 Parliament of New South Wales official YouTube channel 
 

 

 
New South Wales
1824 establishments in Australia